Stenoloba albistriata is a moth of the family Noctuidae. It is found in northern Vietnam.

References

Moths described in 2000
Bryophilinae